Point View is an unincorporated community and census-designated place (CDP) in Blair County, Pennsylvania, United States. It was first listed as a CDP prior to the 2020 census.

The CDP is in eastern Blair County, along the southwestern edge of Catharine Township. It is in the valley of Township Run, which forms the boundary between Catharine and Frankstown Township. The small, steep valley is between Short Mountain to the east and the south end of Canoe Mountain to the west, and drains south to the Frankstown Branch of the Juniata River. Pennsylvania Route 866 is the southern edge of the CDP; the highway leads southeast down the Frankstown Branch  to Williamsburg and west  to U.S. Route 22, which continues west  to Hollidaysburg, the Blair county seat.

Demographics

References 

Census-designated places in Blair County, Pennsylvania
Census-designated places in Pennsylvania